In microprocessor design, gate count refers to the number of logic gates built with transistors and other electronic devices, that are needed to implement a design. Even with today's processor technology providing what was formerly considered impossible numbers of gates in a single chip, gate counts remain one of the most important overall factors in the end price of a chip. Designs with fewer gates will typically cost less, and for this reason gate count remains a commonly used metric in the industry.

The term can also refer to the number of persons entering an event (such as a sports event)  or a library  during a specified period.

See also 

 Transistor count

Semiconductor device fabrication
Logic gates